The Nazlou Chay', is a river in Kurdistan Province and West Azarbaijan Province, Iran, where it flows into Lake Urmia. The river is part of the lake Urmia Catchment near the border of Iraq, Turkey, and Armenia, over use of the water resources of this river has contributed the shrinking of Lake Urmia in recent years.

Rivers of Iran
Landforms of Kurdistan Province